As-Sakn is a settlement in north-eastern Western Sahara. It is within the Moroccan-controlled area of the territory, close to the internationally recognised Moroccan border. As-Sakn is some 100 kilometres north of Smara and 120 kilometres southwest of Tan-Tan.

References
 Map of Western Sahara. United Nations.

Populated places in Western Sahara